The clove hitch is an ancient type of knot, made of two successive single hitches tied around an object. It is most effectively used to secure a middle section of rope to an object it crosses over, such as a line on a fencepost. It can also be used as an ordinary hitch, or as a binding knot, but it is not particularly secure in either application. It is considered one of the most important knots, alongside the bowline and the sheet bend.

Usage
This knot is particularly useful where the length of the running end needs to be adjustable, since feeding in rope from either direction will loosen the knot to be tightened at a new position. With certain types of cord, the clove hitch can slip when loaded. In modern climbing rope, the clove hitch will slip to a point, and then stop slipping. When tied around a carabiner, the load should pull on the end closest to its spine.  With smaller diameter cords, after being heavily weighted it may become difficult to untie. It is also unreliable when used on a square or rectangular post, rather than round.

The clove hitch is also commonly used in pioneering to start and finish a lashing such as the traditional square lashing, tripod lashing, round lashing and shear lashing.

Tying
The clove hitch is tied by first passing the running end of the rope around the spar and back over itself to form an X. The running end then passes around the spar again, under the intersection of the last two turns, and both ends are pulled tight. There are several methods of tying it using both hands or one hand.

Related knots 

When a turn around an object is made and a clove hitch is tied to the rope's own standing part, it produces either a buntline hitch or two half-hitches, depending on whether the turns of the clove hitch progress toward or away from the hitched object. Two-half hitches is also the capsized form of a granny knot. The buntline hitch itself is used as a necktie knot called the four-in-hand knot.

The clove hitch is also a part of a family of binding knots called millers' knots, which all start with a single hitch tied around an object.

See also
List of knots

References

External links

 Notable Knot Index – shows quick method of tying
 Hitch Knots – including instructions
 The Misunderstood Clove Hitch – illustrations and stories